Sermin Özürküt (born 19 December 1949) is a Turkish-Swedish political figure who served in Swedish Parliament, the Riksdag, from 2002 to 2006.

She is a journalist by profession and competed for her electoral seat in Stockholm County as a member of the Left Party.  During her service in the Riksdag she was a Deputy Member of Committee on Housing, Committee on Foreign Affairs, Committee on EU Affairs and was also a member of the delegation to the Organization for Security and Co-operation in Europe and a member of the Swedish Inter-parliamentary group.

References
Sermin Özürküt at the We Are the Turks website (with photograph)
Sermin Özürküt at the Swedish Parliament {Riksdag} website (with photograph) [in Swedish]

Members of the Riksdag from the Left Party (Sweden)
Swedish people of Turkish descent
Living people
1949 births
Place of birth missing (living people)
Members of the Riksdag 2002–2006